The 2022 Oceania Rugby Under 20s, was the sixth edition of the Oceania Rugby Junior Championship. New Zealand won the tournament undefeated, with Argentina as runner-up.

Teams
The teams for the 2022 Oceania Rugby Under 20 tournament were:

Championship

Standings

Round 1

Round 2

Round 3

Trophy
The Oceania Trophy was played at Teufaiva Stadium on Nukuʻalofa, Tonga as a two-match series between Tonga and Samoa.

Standings
Final competition table:
{| class="wikitable" style="text-align:center;"
|-
!width=25 |#
!width=175 |Team
!width=25 abbr="Played" |Pld
!width=25 abbr="Won" |W
!width=25 abbr="Drawn" |D
!width=25 abbr="Lost" |L
!width=32 abbr="Points for" |PF
!width=32 abbr="Points against" |PA
!width=32 abbr="Points difference" |PD
!width=25 abbr="Points" |Pts
|- bgcolor=ccffcc
|- align=center |- style="background: #CCFFCC;"
|1||align=left| 
| 2||1||0||1||27||25||+2||5
|- align=center
|2||align=left| 
| 2||1||0||1||25||27||-2||5
|-
|colspan="10"|Updated:  7 December 2022
|}

Results

References

External links
Oceania Rugby website

Oceania Under 20 Rugby Championship
Oceania Under 20
Oceania Under 20 Rugby Championship
Oceania Under 20 Rugby Championship
Oceania Under 20 Rugby Championship
Oceania Under 20 Rugby Championship
Sport in the Sunshine Coast, Queensland
2022 in youth sport
Oceania Rugby